Fantasma may refer to:

Books, film and TV
El fantasma, Spanish novel written by Wenceslao Fernández Flórez, on which El destino se disculpa 1945 Spanish drama film was based
Fantasma, 2006 Argentine film by Lisandro Alonso
O Fantasma, a 2000 Portuguese gay-themed film

Music
Grupo Fantasma (American band), a Texas band
Fantasma (band), an Argentine cumbia duo
Fantasma (South African band), led by Spoek Mathambo

Albums
Fantasma (Cornelius album)
Fantasma (Baustelle album)
Fantasma, album by Burning Image
El Fantasma, album by Los Yonic's
Fantasmas (Willie Colón album)
Fantasmas (Glorium album)
Los Fantasmas, album by Menudo

Songs
"Fantasma", song Puerto Rican singer Zion from The Perfect Melody
"El Fantasma", Op. 37 No. 5 song by Joaquin Turina (1882-1949) 
"El fantasma", song by Vicentico from Los pájaros 
"El fantasma", song by Verónica Castro from Norteño in 1980

Other uses
El Hijo del Fantasma, or simply Fantasma, Mexican luchador